One Night Stand is a compilation of a concert given on November 8, 1947, at The Town Hall in New York City. The concert featured Sarah Vaughan and Lester Young. The album was released in 1997.  Lester Young is a tenor saxophonist who played with the Count Basie Band in the 1930s and 1940s. It is with this group that he first recorded the first copy of "Lester Leaps In" (the first track on One Night Stand) in 1939.

Track listing 
 "Lester Leaps In" -3:11 Lester Young
 "Just You, Just Me" -5:22 Lester Young
 "Jumpin' With Symphony Sid" -3:50 Lester Young
 "Sunday" -6:20 Lester Young
 "Don't Blame Me" -3:47 Sarah Vaughan
 "My Kinda Love" -1:47 Sarah Vaughan
 "I Cover the Waterfront" -3:36 Sarah Vaughan
 "I Don't Stand a Ghost of a Chance With You" -3:54 Sarah Vaughan
 "Lester's Be Bop Boogie" -4:53 Sarah Vaughan
 "These Foolish Things" -4:56 Lester Young Sextet
 "Movin' With Lester" - 5:51 Lester Young
 "The Man I Love" -3:33 Sarah Vaughan
 "Time After Time" -2:52 Sarah Vaughan
 "Mean To Me" -2:40 Sarah Vaughan
 "Body and Soul" -4:06 Sarah Vaughan
 "I Cried For You" -3:45 Sarah Vaughan

Personnel 
 Sarah Vaughan- vocals
 Lester Young- tenor saxophone
 Shorty McConnell- trumpet
 Sadik Hakim, Sammy Benskin- piano
 Freddie Lacey- guitar
 Rodney Richardson- upright bass
 Roy Haynes- drums

References

Sources
Gridley, Mark C. Jazz Styles: History & Analysis. 9th edn. N.J.: Prentice Hall, 2006. Print.

Lester Young albums
1997 live albums
Sarah Vaughan live albums
Collaborative albums
Albums recorded at the Town Hall
Blue Note Records live albums